Animal Crossing is a series of video games produced by Nintendo.

Animal Crossing may also refer to:

Animal Crossing series:
Animal Crossing (video game), for GameCube
 Animal Crossing: Wild World, for Nintendo DS
 Animal Crossing: City Folk, for Wii
 Animal Crossing: New Leaf, for Nintendo 3DS
 Animal Crossing: Pocket Camp, for iOS/Android devices
Animal Crossing: New Horizons, released on March 20, 2020, for Nintendo Switch
Dōbutsu no Mori (film), the animated film based on the series
 Wildlife crossing, a structure letting wildlife cross a man-made barrier
Hybrid (biology), the result of crossing two animals or plants